Bet9ja is an online bookmaker company that offers betting on major sporting events operating in Nigeria. Traded under KC Gaming Networks Limited and run by a series of shareholders of multiple nationalities, the website is licensed by the Lagos State Lotteries Board (LSLB) with permission to operate in other parts of Nigeria.

Bet9ja.com is the third most-visited website in Nigeria after Google.com and Youtube.com in late April 2020, according to Alexa, a global internet traffic ranking firm. It is also the first most-visited local site in Nigeria and the only Nigerian website in the top 500 most-visited websites globally as of April 2020, according to a recent listing by IABC Africa.

Bet9ja was co-founded by Ayo Ojuroye and Kunle Soname who are its CEO and chairman respectively.   In 2022,Bet9ja became the official sponsor/partner of the Nigeria Professional Football League.

See also
Online gambling

References

External links
 How To Get Access Bet9ja Old Mobile

Bookmakers
Online gambling companies of Nigeria
Companies established in 2013
Companies based in Lagos